Muddy Run is a tributary of Spruce Run in Union County, Pennsylvania, in the United States. Part of the stream is designated as an impaired waterbody due to sedimentation and siltation from grazing-related agriculture. The majority of the watershed is forested, but there is also a considerable amount of agricultural land. A bridge has been constructed over the stream in the community of Mazeppa.

Course

Muddy Run begins near the base of Buffalo Mountain in West Buffalo Township. It flows east-southeast for several tenths of a mile before turning east-northeast and then east-southeast. Several tenths of a mile further downstream, the stream turns south-southeast for a few tenths of a mile before entering Buffalo Township and turning east for a few miles. It then turns southeast for several tenths of a mile before turning northeast. Several hundred feet further downstream, it reaches its confluence with Spruce Run.

Hydrology
The cause of the impairment is sedimentation/siltation and the source of the impairment is grazing-related agriculture. The total maximum daily load date is 2015. In addition to sediment, Muddy Run is also affected by E. coli, nutrient pollution, and thermal radiation.

Another  came from hay and pastures, while  came from unpaved roads. A total of  came from low-density urban development, while  came from other sources.

A total of  came from streambank erosion and  came from other sources.

Other sources contributed .

Geography and geology

Watershed and biology
The mouth of the stream is in the United States Geological Survey quadrangle of Lewisburg. However, the source is in the quadrangle of Mifflinburg. The watershed makes up 3 percent of the watershed of Buffalo Creek.

A total of 57 percent of the watershed of Muddy Run is on forested land. Another 35 percent is on agricultural land, while 3 percent is on impervious surfaces. The amount of land on impervious surfaces could be as high as 26 percent in the future.

History
Muddy Run was entered into the Geographic Names Information System on August 2, 1979. Its identifier in the Geographic Names Information System is 1182059.

A concrete stringer/multi-beam or girder bridge carrying State Route 1001 was constructed over Muddy Run in Mazeppa in 1932.

See also
Black Run (Spruce Run), next tributary of Spruce Run going upstream
List of rivers of Pennsylvania

References

Rivers of Union County, Pennsylvania
Tributaries of Buffalo Creek (West Branch Susquehanna River)
Rivers of Pennsylvania